The Niremont (1,514 m) is a mountain of the Swiss Prealps, in the canton of Fribourg. Due to its rounded shape, it has 2 sub-summits : The Gros Niremont (1,481 m) and the Petit Niremont (1,493 m).

Toponymy 
Its name means Noir Mont in French ("Black Mountain").

Geography

Situation 
The Noirmont stands between the Swiss plateau and the Swiss Alps. The city of Châtel-St-Denis and the A12 motorway are located on its western foot.

The panorama from its summit offers a nice view on the Moléson, the village of Les Paccots, the lake of Geneva and the Jura Mountains.

Hydrology 
Several small tributaries on the west slopes feed the Trême river. On its south side lies the Veveyse de Châtel river, feeding the lake of Geneva.

Fauna and flora 
The Niremont is covered with pine forests, wetlands and mires. A great proportion (402 hectares) is registered on the Inventory of Mire Landscapes of Particular Beauty and National Importance.

Activities 
The small ski resort of Rathvel lies on its eastern slopes. The Niremont is a popular destination for hiking, mountain biking, snowshoeing and ski touring.

See also 
 Rathvel
 Les Paccots
 Moléson

References

External links 
 Les Paccots and Region tourism office

Mountains of Switzerland
Mountains of the Alps
Mountains of the canton of Fribourg
One-thousanders of Switzerland